U-138 may refer to one of the following German submarines:

 , a Type U 127 submarine launched in 1917 and that served in the First World War
 During the First World War, Germany also had this submarine with a similar name:
 , a Type UB III submarine laid down but unfinished at the end of the war; broken up on the slip in 1919
 , a Type IID submarine that served in the Second World War until sunk on 18 June 1941

Submarines of Germany